The Molybrook mine is one of the largest molybdenum mines in Canada. The mine is located in north-east Canada in Newfoundland and Labrador. The Molybrook mine has reserves amounting to 200 million tonnes of molybdenum ore grading 0.05% molybdenum thus resulting 100,000 tonnes of molybdenum.

See also
List of molybdenum mines

References 

Molybdenum mines in Canada